is a Japanese animation director. Until the early 2000s, he was a staff member of the anime studio Sunrise, where he collaborated with Shoji Kawamori to direct his most famous work, The Vision of Escaflowne. Since that time, he worked extensively with Satelight (and occasionally again with Kawamori, who is the studio's executive director) before going freelance once more to direct the Birdy the Mighty TV series, among other projects.

List of works
Mobile Suit Gundam ZZ series (1986–1987) - Production Runner (numerous episodes)
Mobile Suit Gundam: Char's Counterattack movie (1988) - Production Runner
Jushin Liger series (1989–1990) - Episode Director
Dragon Quest series (1989–1991) - Storyboard Artist (episode 17)
Future GPX Cyber Formula series (1991) - Storyboard Artist, Unit Director
Mobile Suit Gundam F91 movie (1991) - Assistant Director
Mobile Suit Gundam 0083: Stardust Memory OVA series (1991–1992) - Unit Director
Dirty Pair Flash: Mission III OVA series (1995–1996) - Storyboard Artist (episode 2)
The Vision of Escaflowne series (1996) - Director, Storyboard Artist (numerous episodes), Unit Director (episode 24)
Cowboy Bebop series (1998–1999) - Storyboard Artist (episode 3)
Turn A Gundam series (1999–2000) - Storyboard Artist
Escaflowne: A Girl in Gaea movie (2000) - Director, Script (with Ryota Yamaguchi)
Geneshaft series (2001) - Director, Storyboard Artist, Planner
Heat Guy J series (2002–2003) - Original Creator, Director, Screenplay, Storyboard Artist, Planner
Samurai Champloo series (2004–2005) - Storyboard Artist
Genesis of Aquarion series (2005) - Storyboard Artist (episode 2)
Noein series (2005) - Original Creator, Director, Series Composition, Script (episodes 1, 2, 16), Episode Director (episode 24), Storyboard Artist (opening credits, 1, 2, 16, 24)
Ergo Proxy series (2006) - Storyboard Artist (episode 20)
Birdy the Mighty Decode series (2008), Director
Code Geass: Akito the Exiled (2012–2016) - Director, Script
Stars Align (2019), Director

References

External links

1962 births
People from Osaka
Anime directors
Japanese animators
Japanese animated film directors
Living people
Sunrise (company) people
Chiba Institute of Technology alumni